Stevan Horvat (7 October 1932 – 28 May 2018) was a Serbian wrestler who competed in the 1960 Summer Olympics, in the 1964 Summer Olympics, and in the 1968 Summer Olympics. He was born in Svetozar Miletić.

References

External links
 

1932 births
2018 deaths
Olympic wrestlers of Yugoslavia
Wrestlers at the 1960 Summer Olympics
Wrestlers at the 1964 Summer Olympics
Wrestlers at the 1968 Summer Olympics
Serbian male sport wrestlers
Olympic silver medalists for Yugoslavia
Olympic medalists in wrestling
World Wrestling Championships medalists
Medalists at the 1968 Summer Olympics
Mediterranean Games gold medalists for Yugoslavia
Competitors at the 1959 Mediterranean Games
Competitors at the 1967 Mediterranean Games
Mediterranean Games medalists in wrestling
Sportspeople from Sombor